San Andrés, Colombia, may refer to:

San Andrés Island, an island of Colombia
San Andrés, San Andrés y Providencia, capital city of San Andrés Island, Colombia
San Andrés, Antioquia, a city in Antioquia Department
San Andrés, Santander, a city in Santander Department